Lynn or Lynne is a predominantly feminine given name in English-speaking countries. It is now more popular as a middle name than as a first name. It comes from Welsh, meaning "lake". It is also popular as a suffix for female first names, such as Kaitlyn, Kaylynn, Kailynn, Kaelinn, Kaelynn, Katelyn, Caitlinn, Caylynn, Caelinn, Catelyn, Madalyn/Madalynn, Adalyn, Jocelyn/Jocelynn, Ashlyn/Ashlynn and Emmalyn/Emmalynn.

Notable people named Lynn

Lynn (voice actress), Japanese voice actress
Lynn Abbey (born 1948), American author
Lynn Ahrens (born 1948), American writer and lyricist
Lynn Anderson (born 1947), American singer
Lynn Alvarez (born 1985), American mixed martial artist
Lynn Barber (born 1944), British journalist
Lynn H. Becklin (born 1932), American politician
Lynn Bertholet (born 1959), Swiss bank executive
Lyn Mikel Brown (born 1956), American academic, author, feminist and activist
Lynne Butler (born 1955), American mathematician
Lynn Carlin (born 1938), American actress
Lynne Cheney (born 1941), American author, scholar and talk-show host
Lynn Collins (born 1977), American actress
Lynn Dean (1923-2022), American politician
Lynn Deas (1952-2020), American professional bridge player
Lynne Featherstone (born 1951), British politician
Lynn Flewelling (born 1958) American author
Lynn Goldsmith (born 1948), American recording artist and portrait photographer
Lynn Hilary (born 1982), Irish singer, guitarist and songwriter
Lynn Jennings (born 1960), American long-distance runner
Lynn Mahoney (born 1964), American university president.
Lynn Margulis (1938–2011), American theorist and biologist, author, educator and popularizer
Lynn Martin, American banker, 68th president of the New York Stock Exchange
Lynne McGranger (born 1953), Australian actress
Lynne Neagle (born 1968), Welsh politician
J. Lynn Palmer, American biostatistician
Lynn Redgrave (1943–2010), English-American actress
Lynn N. Rivers (born 1956), American politician and lawyer
Lynne Stewart (1939-2017), American defense attorney
Lynne Stopkewich (born 1964), Canadian film director
Lynne Thigpen (1948-2003), African-American actress and singer
Lynn Turner, multiple people
Lynn Vidali (born 1952), American swimmer
Lynn Whitfield (born 1953), American actress and producer
Lynn Faulds Wood (1948–2020), Scottish television presenter and journalist
Lynn Zelevansky (born 1947), American art curator

Male
Lynn Allen (1891–1958), American football player
Lynn Bowden (born 1997), American football player
Lynn Bradford, American football player
Lynn Compton (1921–2012), American lawyer and soldier
Lynn Davies (born 1942), Welsh athlete 
Lynn W. Enquist, American molecular biologist
Lynn Frazier, Governor of North Dakota 
Lynn Harrell (1944–2020), American classical cellist
Lynn M. Hilton (1924–2010), American politician
Lynn Hoffman (author) (born 1944), American writer
Lynn Matthews (born 1944), American athlete
Lynn Okamoto (born 1970), Japanese Mangaka
Lynn Riggs (1899–1954), American playwright
Lynn Nolan Ryan, Jr. (born 1947), American baseball player
Lynn Shackelford (born 1947), American basketball player
Lynn Strait (born 1967), American singer
Lynn Swann (born 1952), American athlete
Lynn Thomas (1959–2021), American football player

Fictional characters named Lynn
 Lynn Langermann, one of the main characters in the survival horror video game Outlast 2
Lynn Loud Jr., one of the main characters and fifth child of the Loud siblings in The Loud House
 Lynn Loud Sr., father of Loud siblings in The Loud House
 Lynne, a police detective from the video game Ghost Trick: Phantom Detective
 Lynne, a Survey Corps member for the manga and anime series Attack on Titan
 Lynne, a.k.a. Lynette Bishop, a character from the mixed-media franchise Strike Witches
 Lynn Belvedere, The main funny character from Mr. Belvedere Lynn McGill, high-ranking official in season 5 of 24 (TV series)  Lynn Stewart, Jefferson Pierce's wife and neurosurgeon in Black LightningSee also
 Lyn (given name)
 Lynne (surname)
 Lynn (surname)
 Dublin, derivation Dubh Linn'' ("black pool")
 All articles beginning with "Lynn"

Notes

Given names
Unisex given names
Welsh unisex given names
English-language unisex given names
Irish unisex given names
Scottish unisex given names